Women in Sri Lanka make up to 52.09% of the population according to the 2012 census of Sri Lanka. Sri Lankan women have contributed greatly to the country's development, in many areas. Historically, a masculine bias has dominated Sri Lankan culture, and they are allowed to vote in election since 1931. Although Sri Lanka has been tremendously successful in achieving greater gender parity, women still suffer a lower status compared with men.

In 2017, Sri Lanka was raked the world's 11th safest country for women by the New World Wealthy research group.

History 

Over two millennia ago, Sinhala women mostly of royal and noble rank enjoyed certain individual liberties and social opportunities approximating to that of equality with men. Sinhala women participated with men in many public matters, enjoyed an independent status as women, as mothers, and had an identity in private and public life, and the freedom to choose one's way of life. After the establishment of Buddhism, they made another progressive move, to renounce lay life and seek ordination. The effective strides they made socially, culturally, and politically from about 300 B.C. in the little island of Sinhala could be primarily attributed to Buddhist tenets and the Buddhist ethos. Women to a large degree were beneficiaries of this great humanism. Historical evidence suggests that there had been six queens ruling the island in the past. From infamous Queen Anula (47 BC – 42 BC) to Don Katharina (Kusumasana Devi) (1581) who ruled the country from Kandy. Queen Leelawati (1197–1212) the wife of King Parakramabahu (1153–1186), was the fourth queen of the island o Sri Lanka. She ruled the country from the second Kingdom Polonnaruwa of Sri Lanka.

The role of women in Sri Lankan society is a topic that has been debated and fought over for several centuries. During the British colonial period, for example, a significant strand of nationalist, anticolonial agitation centred on the role and status of Ceylon women, both within and outside the home. In the transition years following colonial rule, Sri Lankan policymakers introduced a social policy package of free health and education services and subsidized food, which dramatically improved women's quality of life. Compared to the rest of South Asian countries, Sri Lanka women are very well off, enjoying high life expectancy (80 years), nearly universal literacy, and access to economic opportunities, which are nearly unmatched in the rest of the subcontinent.

Economic development 
Expert agriculture and largely feminized labour forces in South Asia has expanded significantly in the last three decades. Men are twice as likely as women to be employed in Sri Lanka. (30-35%) The country's female labour force participation is lower than that of its regional neighbours like Nepal, China and Bangladesh. In fact, Sri Lanka has the 20th largest gender gap in labour force participation in the world. According to study, Sri Lanka could add 14% (US$20 billion) to its annual GDP by 2025 by increasing female labour force participation and the number of paid hours women work, as well as by adding women to higher productivity sectors. After India, this is the largest relative gain projected for the Asia-Pacific region. In the context of expected sovereign debt default where access to capital markets and multilateral loans will close-off government spending will fall economic gains of this scale cannot be ignored. In 2017, out of the 8.5 million females who were 15 years and above, only 3.1 million females were in the labour force, while only 2.9 million were employed. Out of this, as many as 1.5 million women were working in the informal sector.

Rape and sexual violence

Domestic violence 
Two in five women in Sri Lanka gave faced violence by a partner in their lifetime, a government survey has found. Psychological violence at the hands of a partner, that involves emotional abuse or controlling a women's behaviour was recorded at 27.9%, the highest among all forms of violence past decade. Physical violence mostly experienced while their partners were drunk also prevailed mostly in the estate region, followed by the rural and urban areas respectively, according to the report. It outlined startling details which showed that the kids of most affected mothers were reported to have experienced nightmares, while 4.5% had dropped out of school. Women between 15 to 34 years were more prone to all forms of violence. 5,891 of child abuse cases were reported in the country from 2012 to 2020. According to the UN, 90% of women in Sri Lanka have experienced sexual harassment in public transport.

Rape 
The age if consent in Sri Lanka is 16 that children below the age of sixteen are not considered able to give consent, thus, a person engaging in sexual relations with someone age 16 or under is recognised as having committed statutory rape. Statutory rape cases increase 35%, in 2021, compared to 2020, the performance report of the Sri Lanka Police for the year 2021 reveals. About 1,016 cases were reported in 2020 and in 2021 the number if reported incidents increased to 361.

Child Marriage 
The internationally preferred age for marriage is 18 years for both boys and girls. Sri Lanka and Nepal are the only countries in South Asia that have specified a minimum age of 18 at which both boys and girls can legally marry. Child marriage are extremely low in Sri Lanka, child marriages account for 2% of the marriages on the island. That 2% however, is the result of the drawn-out civil war and unfortified laws.

References 

Women by country
Sri Lankan women